Paris–Corrèze was a road bicycle race held annually in France, usually between a department near Paris and the department of Corrèze. It was created by Laurent Fignon and Max Mamers. It was first held in 2001 and since 2005 it has been organised as a 2.1 event on the UCI Europe Tour. The last edition was 2012 as budgetary problems caused the race to disappear after 2013.

Winners

External links

 Official Website 

UCI Europe Tour races
Defunct cycling races in France
Recurring sporting events established in 2001
2001 establishments in France
Cycle races in France
Recurring sporting events disestablished in 2012
2012 disestablishments in France